Aliki Theofilopoulos Kiriakou  (born June 14, 1972) is a Greek-American executive producer, director, writer, animator and storyboard artist. She is well known for her work on television series Phineas and Ferb and Descendants: Wicked World.  She began her career on Disney films such as Hercules, Mulan, Fantasia 2000 and many more.

Biography 
Theofilopoulos was born in La Jolla, California and raised in San Diego. She attended the University of Southern California and shortly after graduation, moved to Los Angeles.

Filmography 
 Doug Unplugs (2020–present), executive producer
 Solar Opposites (2020–present), director
 Harvey Girls Forever! (2018–2020), voice actress (Chloe Claireson) supervising producer, director
 Descendants: Wicked World (2015), director
 Doctor Lollipop (2013), director
 Phineas and Ferb (2008–2014), voice actress (Mandy), storyboard artist, writer
 Random! Cartoons (2007), creator (Yaki & Yumi, Girls on the Go!), voice actress (Sweet Little Girl, Fortune Fish, Kid #1, Kelly, Mrs. Dusenberry, Crimson) title cards, voice director, co-producer, writer, storyboard artist, character designer
 Superior Defender Gundam Force (2004), voice actress (Zero, Bell Wood, Zakos)
 Home on the Range (2004), animator
 ChalkZone (2002–2004), storyboard revisionist, character designer, clean up artist  
 Treasure Planet (2002), animator
 Atlantis: The Lost Empire (2001), animator
 Fantasia 2000 (1999), animator
 Tarzan (1999), animator
 Hercules (1997), animator

References

External links

Animation Insider: Aliki Theofilopoulos Grafft

1972 births
Living people
American voice actresses
American television writers
People from La Jolla, San Diego
American storyboard artists
American animators
American people of Greek descent
American women television writers
Screenwriters from California
21st-century American women